Love is a 2020 Indian Malayalam-language black comedy psychological thriller film written and directed by Khalid Rahman and produced by Ashiq Usman under the banner of Ashiq Usman Productions. The film stars Rajisha Vijayan, Shine Tom Chacko in lead roles.

Love marks the tenth project of Ashiq Usman and third film of Khalid Rahman after Unda and Anuraga Karikkin Vellam. The film is co-written and edited by Noufal Abdullah. The music is composed by Yakzan Gary Pereira and Neha Nair, while Jimshi Khalid was hired as the cinematographer. The film received mostly positive reviews from audiences and critics, who praised the dark theme, dialogues, acting, music and screenplay.

Plot
The movie begins when Deepthi is doing scanning and the doctor confirms that she is 8 weeks pregnant. Her husband Anoop gets a text message "I am pregnant" but he continues to play a violent video game. Deepthi reaches home and soon they both start arguing. The fight turns violent and Anoop pushes her against their picture on the wall and Deepthi immediately collapses. Confused, Anoop decides to suicide and tries to cut his nerves using a shaving blade and then he hears a ring on the door. He takes the body of Deepthi to the bathroom.

At the door, it was a friend of Anoop played by Gokulan and he starts talking about his life's problems and starts drinking of what was left in the bottle Anoop was having. Anoop tries to console his friend saying that he has to talk out the indifferences with his wife. Apparently he doubts his wife is having an affair with his partner and the partner is trying to steal all his money by cheating him in their combined business. His wife is blaming him for not having kids, but when Anoop says he had already impregnated his earlier girlfriend and his friend replies that he cannot tell that to his wife and prove himself. He wants to suicide because he is fed up with life but after speaking to Anoop he changes his mind and decides to kill his partner instead.

Meanwhile, another friend played by Sudhi Koppa comes home with his girl friend and tells Anoop that they both need to spend half an hour in their bedroom. While the friend and his girl friend are talking in the room, the girl friend receives a message from a guy and he gets annoyed. He asks her to immediately delete all messages and stop talking to him. Meanwhile, he gets a call from his wife and starts questioning him where he is. He denies that he is with his girl friend and that he does not have any contact with her. That starts a fight between them and the girl friend leaves saying that she does not want to be a casual partner for him.

Deepthi's father comes home to meet Anoop. He tries to talk about his daughter's problems but Anoop is not interested. Anoop also says he has no financial issues. When the dad asks him if he physically abuses his wife, Anoop says that he has the rights to do whatever to his wife. Dad slaps Anoop and says he is Anoop's dad and he also has that rights and leaves. The two friends sees this from the balcony but they stop themselves in interfering because its a personal matter of Anoop.

He hears a knock on the door again and when he opens the door, he sees Deepthi. Deepthi enters the house but now the house is clean as if nothing happened. Soon the fight turns fierce. Deepthi accuses Anoop for having an affair and also being irresponsible in this business ventures and losing all the money. From the conversation we understands that the two friends who are at his home are not two outside persons, but multiple personalities of Anoop itself. One of them wants to kill Deepthi while the other says No. Finally Anoop hits Deepthi on her head with iron box and Deepthi collapses.

In the final scene of the movie, we see a car which gets stopped by police for checking. We see Deepthi on the driving seat who confesses that she killed her husband and the body is in the trunk. It is left to the viewer to guess how Anoop was killed.

Cast
 Shine Tom Chacko as Anoop
 Rajisha Vijayan as Deepthi
 Gokulan as a friend of Anoop 
 Sudhi Koppa as a friend of Anoop
 Veena Nandakumar as Haritha
 Johny Antony as Deepthi's father 
 Rony David as YouTuber Ajith Chacko 
John Kaippallil as Police Officer
 Sunny Wayne as Shelby(voice only)
Aji Peter Thankam as Neighbour

Production
After the success of Unda, Khalid Rahman announced that the next film will have Rajisha Vijayan and Shine Tom Chacko in lead roles. Both were collaborated with him in his previous films. He also informed that additional cast includes Veena Nandakumar, Sudhi Koppa, Johny Antony, and Gokulan M.S. Principal cinematography started on June 22, 2020, in Kochi, adhering to COVID-19 protocol guidelines. On July 15, the crew informed that the film shoot has completed and it only took 23 days.

Release
Love was released in United Arab Emirates on 15 October 2020. Love is the first Malayalam film to release in UAE cinemas after a long spell owing to restrictions to contain the coronavirus outbreak. The film released in Kerala on 29 January 2021.

Love has been streaming on Netflix since  19 February 2021.

Baradwaj Rangan of Film Companion South wrote "Love is tricky, and therefore, Love is tricky, too. It flips around genres like mad: it’s a narcissistic murder mystery like Alfred Hitchcock’s Rope mixed with a psychological black comedy like David Fincher’s Fight Club mixed with a domestic-abuse drama like Anubhav Sinha’s Thappad".

Remake 
A Tamil adaptation with the same title is set to release in 2023 with Bharath and Vani Bhojan in the lead roles. The Tamil remake is directed by RP Bala.

References

External links

2020s Malayalam-language films
2020 films
Indian black comedy films
Indian thriller films
Films directed by Khalid Rahman